Convento de San José may refer to:

 Convento de San José (Ávila), Spain
 Convento de San José (Jerez de la Frontera), Spain